"Clones (We're All)" is a 1980 single by American singer Alice Cooper taken from his fifth solo studio album Flush the Fashion (1980).

Background
The song is about forced conformity. Cooper reports that he wanted to do the song because he was looking for a new sound. The song was written by David Carron (1949–85), who had created the group Shenandoah, which went on to play with Arlo Guthrie, and the short-lived Gulliver.

Chart performance
The song peaked at No.40 in the US Billboard charts, Cooper's first top 40 single in two years. Uncharacteristically for Cooper, it also charted on the Disco Top 100 in the US, peaking at No.69.

Appearances on albums
Flush the Fashion
A Fistful of Alice
The Life and Crimes of Alice Cooper
Mascara and Monsters: The Best of Alice Cooper
School's Out and Other Hits

Covers
The song has been covered by many artists, including:
The Smashing Pumpkins and first released on the "Bullet with Butterfly Wings" maxi-CD in 1996.
The Epoxies
Penal Colony
Mose Giganticus
Bile, and the Wildbunch

References

External links
 

1980 singles
Alice Cooper songs
Song recordings produced by Roy Thomas Baker
Warner Records singles
Cloning in fiction
1980 songs
American new wave songs